Stormy is a 1935 American drama film directed by Lew Landers, written by Ben Grauman Kohn and George H. Plympton, and starring Noah Beery, Jr., Jean Rogers, J. Farrell MacDonald, Raymond Hatton, Walter Miller and Fred Kohler. It was released on October 22, 1935, by Universal Pictures.

Plot

Cast  
Noah Beery, Jr. as Stormy
Jean Rogers as Kerry Dorn
J. Farrell MacDonald as Trinidad Dorn
Raymond Hatton as Stuffy
Walter Miller as Craig
Fred Kohler as Deem Dorn
James P. Burtis as Greasy
The Arizona Wranglers as Cowhand Musicians
Rex, King of the Wild Horses as Rex
Rex Junior as Rex as a Colt

References

External links 
 

1935 films
American drama films
1935 drama films
Universal Pictures films
Films directed by Lew Landers
American black-and-white films
Films with screenplays by George H. Plympton
1930s English-language films
1930s American films